The 1991 Cork Intermediate Football Championship was the 56th staging of the Cork Intermediate Football Championship since its establishment by the Cork County Board in 1909. The draw for the opening round fixtures took place on 16 December 1990.

The final was played on 8 September 1991 at Páirc Uí Chaoimh in Cork, between Aghada and Ballincollig, in what was their first ever final meeting. Aghada won the match by 0-09 to 0-08 to claim their first ever championship title title.

Results

First round

Second round

Quarter-finals

Semi-finals

Final

Championship statistics

Top scorers

Overall

In a single game

References

Cork Intermediate Football Championship